Ali Sunal (born 22 September 1977) is a Turkish actor. He is the son of actor and comedian Kemal Sunal. He is best known for his role as Mahmut in the movie Propaganda and Mustafa in the series En Son Babalar Duyar and Benim Annem Bir Melek, Yaprak Dökümü. He directs sketch theatre "Güldür Güldür Show" for long time.Sunal studied communication at Yeditepe University, and then worked at Sadri Alışık Cultural Center and Dormen Theatre for a while. Meanwhile, he pursued a career in television and cinema. In 1999, he graduated from Istanbul University with a degree in communication studies. He then joined the crew of Theatre İstanbul. Since 2013, he has served as both the choreography director and actor in the comedy show Güldür Güldür.

Filmography

References

External links 
 
 

Turkish male stage actors
Turkish male film actors
Turkish male television actors
1977 births
Male actors from Istanbul
Living people
Istanbul University alumni